Chilocorsia is a genus of moths of the family Crambidae. It contains only one species, Chilocorsia punctinotalis, which is found in Ecuador (Loja Province).

References

Pyraustinae
Crambidae genera
Monotypic moth genera
Taxa named by Eugene G. Munroe